is a private junior women's college in Fukuoka, Fukuoka, Japan, established in 1967.

Alumni 
Satoko Nakano, model and actress

External links
 Official website 

Educational institutions established in 1967
Private universities and colleges in Japan
Universities and colleges in Fukuoka Prefecture
Japanese junior colleges